David with the Head of Goliath may refer to many paintings, including:

 David with the Head of Goliath (Caravaggio, Rome)
 David with the Head of Goliath (Caravaggio, Vienna)
 David with the Head of Goliath (Castagno)
 David with the head of Goliath (Leyster)
 David with the Head of Goliath (Massimo Stanzione)